Zhacheng is a metro station of Zhengzhou Metro Line 5.

History 
The station was opened on 20 May 2019.

Station layout 
The station has two levels underground, The B1 level is for the concourse and the B2 level is for the single island platform of Line 5.

Exits 
The station currently has 3 exits.

References 

Stations of Zhengzhou Metro
Line 5, Zhengzhou Metro
Railway stations in China opened in 2019